Sandy Point 221 is an Indian reserve in Alberta.

References 

Indian reserves in Alberta
Lake Athabasca